Crasnencoe (Krasnenke , Krasnenkoe) is a commune in the Rîbnița District of Transnistria, Moldova. It is composed of three villages: Crasnencoe, Dimitrova (Дмитрівка, Димитрова) and Ivanovca (Іванівка, Ивановка). It has since 1990 been administered as a part of the self-proclaimed Pridnestrovian Moldavian Republic (PMR).

References

Communes of Transnistria
Bratslav Voivodeship
Baltsky Uyezd
Rîbnița District